Earl Harold Sande (November 13, 1898 – August 19, 1968) was an American Hall of Fame jockey and thoroughbred horse trainer.

Early life in South Dakota
Born in Groton, South Dakota, Earl Sande started out as a bronco buster in the early 1900s but then became a successful American quarter horse rider before switching to thoroughbred horse racing in 1918.

Career
Sande joined Cal Shilling and Johnny Loftus as a contract rider for Commander J. K. L. Ross. In 1919, he tied an American record with six wins on a single racecard at Havre de Grace Racetrack. He went on to ride for noted owners such as Harry F. Sinclair, and Samuel D. Riddle and was the leading money-winning jockey in the United States in 1921, 1923, and again in 1927. He won both the Belmont Stakes five times and the Jockey Club Gold Cup on four occasions, the Kentucky Derby three times and the Preakness Stakes once. In 1923, he won 39 stakes races for Harry F. Sinclair's Rancocas Stable, ten of which were on ultimate Horse of the Year winner Zev, including the Kentucky Derby, Belmont Stakes, and a match race against England's Epsom Derby winner Papyrus. Sande's most famous wins came aboard Gallant Fox in 1930 when he won the U.S. Triple Crown.

Sande's fame was such that he was immortalized in a number of poems by Damon Runyon.

Retirement
Following his retirement in 1932, Earl Sande remained in the industry as a trainer. In 1938 he was the United States leading trainer and by the mid-1940s owned and operated his own racing stable.

In 1955, Earl Sande was inducted into the National Museum of Racing and Hall of Fame. His life story was told in the 2004 book by Richard J. Maturi titled "Triple Crown Winner: The Earl Sande Saga".

Earl Sande died in 1968 in a Jacksonville, Oregon nursing home.

References
 Earl Sande's biography at the United States National Museum of Racing and Hall of Fame

1898 births
1968 deaths
American jockeys
American Champion jockeys
United States Thoroughbred Racing Hall of Fame inductees
People from Groton, South Dakota